Acraea viviana, the straw-coloured acraea, is a butterfly in the family Nymphalidae. It is found in Nigeria, Cameroon, Angola, the north-eastern part of the Democratic Republic of the Congo, Uganda, western Kenya and north-western Tanzania.

Description

A. viviana Stgr. (56 c) is similar above to the preceding species and has the same light yellow markings. The hindmarginal spot of the forewing is, however, much broader, completely covering the base of cellule 2, and the median band of the hindwing is 6-8 mm. in breadth and in cellules 4 and 5 distally widened; the hindmarginal spot of the forewing forms a small spot in the lower angle of the cell. The under surface differs in the smaller number of the black dots in the basal area of the hindwing; in the cell and in cellule 7 these are connected by red streaks. Cameroons to Uganda and Bukoba.

Biology
The habitat consists of sub-montane forests at altitudes above 1,300 meters.

The larvae feed on Triumfetta rhomboidea.

Taxonomy
See Pierre & Bernaud, 2014

References

External links

Die Gross-Schmetterlinge der Erde 13: Die Afrikanischen Tagfalter. Plate XIII 56 c

Butterflies described in 1896
viviana
Butterflies of Africa
Taxa named by Otto Staudinger